Draculoides is a genus of troglobite arachnid endemic to North West Australia. Often mistaken for a spider, D. bramstokeri is a schizomid — a small, soil-dwelling invertebrate that walks on six legs and uses two modified front legs as feelers. It uses large fang-like pedipalps, or pincers, to grasp invertebrate prey and crunch it into pieces before sucking out the juices.

The genus was first described in 1992 by M.S. Harvey of the Western Australian Museum, based on his earlier description of Schizomus vinei (Draculoides vinei).

A second species was described in 1995, Draculoides bramstokeri, based on specimens found at Barrow Island, Western Australia; the specific epithet honours Bram Stoker, the author of Dracula. The allusion to this fictional character, a vampire, in the name of the genus is given for the method of consuming its prey.

Species 
, the World Schizomida Catalog accepts the following six species:

 Draculoides bramstokeri Harvey & Humphreys, 1995 – Australia (Western Australia)
 Draculoides brooksi Harvey, 2001 – Australia (Western Australia)
 Draculoides julianneae Harvey, 2001 – Australia (Western Australia)
 Draculoides mesozeirus Harvey, Berry, Edward & Humphreys, 2008 – Australia (Western Australia)
 Draculoides neoanthropus Harvey, Berry, Edward & Humphreys, 2008 – Australia (Western Australia)
 Draculoides vinei (Harvey, 1988) – Australia (Western Australia)

See also 
 Threatened fauna of Australia

References

Further reading 
 

Arachnids of Australia
Arthropods of Western Australia
Schizomida genera
Cave arachnids
Dracula
Endemic fauna of Australia